The New Deal Cafe is a restaurant, music venue and community coffee house in the historic Roosevelt Center of Greenbelt, Maryland.  It is a rare example of a restaurant operated as a consumers' cooperative, as it is owned by over 200 member patrons.

The cafe, which has a small beer/wine bar in the back room, features nightly and some daytime performances by regional musicians, and sponsors several outdoor music festivals each year, including the Crazy Quilt Festival and the Greenbelt Blues Festival. The cafe walls are decorated with art by local artists, which is changed bi-monthly. The arts and entertainment activities are supported by the Friends of New Deal Café Arts (FONDCA), a separate tax-exempt 501(c)(3) organization. The New Deal Cafe won WTOP's Top-10 2012 best music venue in the DC region.

The cafe's menu offers breakfast, lunch, and, dinner options as well as a variety of smoothies and coffee beverages. New Deal Cafe is currently under management by the Greenbelt Consumers Co-op grocery store.  There is beer on tap and a selection of wines and bottled beer.

The cafe is commonly referred to by customers as "Greenbelt's community living room" or "third place", part of the third place movement.

Its name comes from Franklin Delano Roosevelt's New Deal, which was responsible for the founding of Greenbelt.

History
The New Deal Cafe was founded by a group of Greenbelt residents in 1995. In November 2004, over 600 people attended an open house to support the project. From 1995 to 2000, the cafe operated as a part-time coffeehouse in the Greenbelt Community Center. In April 2000, the cafe obtained a lease and opened its current full-time retail space, which was doubled in size in 2005 with expansion into an adjacent space. For several years, it struggled without a kitchen on the premises, and its debt increased. However, in June 2008, the cafe built a kitchen as part of a four-month renovation using volunteer and professional contract labor, and contracted the restaurant operations with chef Karim Kmaiha and his wife, Maria Almeida, to operate the restaurant.

On November 30, 2016, the cafe ended the restaurant operations contract with Chef Kmaiha. In the summer of 2018, the cafe contracted with Michael and Leah Moon to manage the restaurant operations, their partnership ended in 2021. It is currently being managed by the Greenbelt Consumers Co-op Grocery Store manager.

References

External links

 New Deal Cafe website

Consumers' cooperatives in the United States
Restaurants in Maryland
Greenbelt, Maryland
Buildings and structures in Prince George's County, Maryland
Restaurants established in 1994
1994 establishments in Maryland